Jesse Lee Carleton (August 20, 1862 – December 6, 1921) was an American golfer who competed in the 1904 Summer Olympics.

Biography
Jesse Carleton was born in Cumberland, Maryland.

In 1904 he was part of the American team which won the bronze medal. He finished twelfth in this competition. In the individual competition he finished 16th in the qualification and was eliminated in the first round of the match play.

Outside of golf, he owned the Carleton Dry Goods Company. He was president of the Missouri State Golf Association for three years, and president of the Sunset Hill Country Club for three years.

Jesse Carleton died from a cerebral hemorrhage at his home in St. Louis on December 6, 1921.

References

External links
 Profile

American male golfers
Amateur golfers
Golfers at the 1904 Summer Olympics
Olympic bronze medalists for the United States in golf
Medalists at the 1904 Summer Olympics
Sportspeople from Cumberland, Maryland
1862 births
1921 deaths